Louis Abeille may refer to:

 Louis Paul Abeille (1719–1807), French economist
 Ludwig Abeille (1761–1838), German pianist and composer